The Freedom of Access to Clinic Entrances Act (FACE or the Access Act, Pub. L. No. 103-259, 108 Stat. 694) (May 26, 1994) is a United States law that was signed by President Bill Clinton in May 1994, which prohibits the following three things: (1) the use of physical force, threat of physical force, or physical obstruction to intentionally injure, intimidate, interfere with or attempt to injure, intimidate or interfere with any person who is obtaining an abortion, (2) the use of physical force, threat of physical force, or physical obstruction to intentionally injure, intimidate, interfere with or attempt to injure, intimidate or interfere with any person who is exercising or trying to exercise their First Amendment right of religious freedom at a place of religious worship, (3) the intentional damage or destruction of a reproductive health care facility or a place of worship.

Background 
Between the years 1978 and 1993, there was an increase in the number of crimes committed against abortion providers and abortion clinics. According to statistics gathered by the National Abortion Federation (NAF), an organization of abortion providers, since 1977 in the United States and Canada, there have been at least 9 murders, 17 attempted murders, 406 death threats, 179 incidents of assault or battery, and 5 kidnappings committed against abortion providers. In addition, since 1977 in the United States and Canada, property crimes committed against abortion providers have included 41 bombings, 175 arsons, 96 attempted bombings or arsons, 692 bomb threats, 1993 incidents of trespassing, 1400 incidents of vandalism, and 100 attacks with butyric acid ("stink bombs"). In April 1992, thousands of "prayer warriors" and anti-abortion protesters met at the entrances of Buffalo Abortion Clinics for a planned month of picketing and blockades, trying to dissuade women from ending their pregnancies. After seven days of protests, involving Operation Rescue, over 400 protesters were arrested.

One anti-abortion group known as the Army of God was especially active in committing these violent crimes. This group alone was responsible for bombing and setting fire to over one hundred clinics before 1994. They also invaded more than three hundred clinics and vandalized more than four hundred In 1993, officials found the Army of God Manual, a tactical guide to arson, chemical attacks, invasions and bombing, buried in the backyard of Army of God activist Shelley Shannon’s home. Shelley Shannon was soon found guilty of the attempted murder of Dr. George Tiller that same year.

In addition to committing acts of violence, some anti-abortion activists were known to stalk medical personnel and use their photographs on "Wanted for Murder" posters. This on-going violence reached its peak in March 1993 when Dr. David Gunn, a physician whose medical practice included abortion procedures, was shot and killed by Michael F. Griffin outside of the Pensacola Women's Medical Services clinic located in Pensacola, Florida. This increase in violence had become very burdensome to local law enforcement, and according to some, local policing of the issue was often lax. Certain senators and representatives believed that such unlawful conduct was interfering with the constitutional right of women to receive reproductive health care services (abortion in particular), which was guaranteed by the Supreme Court after the ruling of Roe v. Wade in 1973, until revoked by the ruling of Dobbs v. Jackson Women's Health Organization in 2022.

Legislative history 
The Act was passed in direct response to the escalation of violent tactics used by anti-abortion activists that culminated in the "Spring of Life" at Buffalo Abortion Clinics, in April 1992 and the murder of Dr. Gunn in March 1993.

The FACE Act was originally introduced in January 1993 and chiefly sponsored by Representative Chuck Schumer (D--NY), with Representative Constance Morella (R--MD) as the chief co-sponsor. A version of the bill was introduced in the Senate in March 1993, this one sponsored by Senator Edward Kennedy (D--MA). Both the House and the Senate approved the bill in November 1993. The House passed the bill by voice vote, and the Senate passed it 69–30, with a notable 17 Republicans voting for the bill. A joint committee between the House and Senate combined the two bills shortly after, and then-President Bill Clinton signed the bill into law which went into effect in May 1994.

Provisions

Definitions 
Many of the words used in the official text of the Freedom of Access to Clinic Entrances Act are subject to different interpretations. For this reason the Civil Rights Division of the United States Department of Justice provided formal definitions for these terms:

 Facility—The term "facility" includes a hospital, clinic, physician's office, or other facility that provides reproductive health services, and includes the building or structure in which the facility is located.
 Interfere with—The term "interfere with" means to restrict a person's freedom of movement.
 Intimidate—The term "intimidate" means to place a person in reasonable apprehension of bodily harm to him- or herself or to another.
 Physical obstruction—The term "physical obstruction" means rendering impassable entrance to or exit from a facility that provides reproductive health services or to or from a place of religious worship, or rendering passage to or from such a facility or place of religious worship unreasonably difficult or hazardous.
 Reproductive health services—The term "reproductive health services" means reproductive health services provided in a hospital, clinic, physician's office, or other facility, and includes medical, surgical, counseling or referral services relating to the human reproductive system, including services relating to pregnancy or the termination of a pregnancy.

Prohibited 
§ 248. Freedom of access to clinic entrances: (a) Prohibited activities.--Whoever-- (1) by force or threat of force or by physical obstruction, intentionally injures, intimidates or interferes with or attempts to injure, intimidate or interfere with any person because that person is or has been, or in order to intimidate such person or any other person or any class of persons from, obtaining or providing reproductive health services 

The following behaviors have especially to do with reproductive health care clinics but can also be applied to places of worship:

 Blocking a person’s access to the entrance of a facility
 Impairing cars from entering and/or exiting a facility
 Physically stopping people as they are trying to walk toward an entrance or through a parking lot
 Making it difficult or dangerous to get in and/or out of a facility
 Trespassing on the property of a facility
 Committing any act of violence on a clinic employee, escort or patient
 Vandalism
 Threats of violence
 Stalking a clinic employee or reproductive health care provider
 Arson or threats of arson
 Bombings or bomb threats
 Intimidation

Not prohibited 
The following behaviors are not prohibited because they are protected under the First Amendment right to free speech:

 Protesting outside of clinics
 Distributing literature
 Carrying signs
 Shouting (as long as no threats are made)
 Singing hymns
 Counseling

Penalties for Violation 
The criminal penalties for violating FACE vary according to the severity of the offense and the defendant's prior record of similar violations. A first-time offender can be sentenced to a maximum of one year in prison and fined at most $100,000. For a second violation, the violator may be imprisoned for up to three years and fined at most $250,000. However, a strictly non-violent offense is punishable with up to six months in prison and up to $10,000 in fines for a first offense, and up to 18 months in prison and up to $25,000 in fines for subsequent offenses. If the offense causes injury to a person, the maximum sentence is 10 years, regardless of whether or not it is a first offense, and any offense that results in death is punishable with up to life in prison. These are maximum sentences; lesser penalties are permitted at the judge's discretion.

Impact
According to statistics gathered by the National Abortion Federation (NAF), incidents of the more disastrous forms of violence (such as murder, attempted murder, bombing and arson) have decreased since 1994, the year the Freedom of Access to Clinic Entrances Act was enacted.  The Clinton administration prosecuted 17 defendants for violations of the FACE act in 1997, and prosecuted an average of about 10 defendants per year since the law was enacted. The George W. Bush administration, by comparison, only prosecuted about two defendants per year for violations of the FACE act. According to Cathleen Mahoney, Executive Vice President of the National Abortion Federation and former attorney for the Justice Department, "The amount of [violent] activity really did drop a lot after FACE was enacted and it was beginning to be enforced".

In July 2022, Republican Representative Ted Budd and Senator Thom Tillis of North Carolina wrote to the state's Attorney General, Josh Stein, asking him to apply the FACE Act to protect CPCs in North Carolina, saying that there was vandalism at the Mountain Area Pregnancy Services facility.

Judicial review
In 1995, American Life League attempted to challenge the FACE Act in The United States District Court for the Eastern District of Virginia in a case called American Life League, Inc. v. Reno, but lost when the court upheld the FACE Act.

Following passage of the Freedom of Access to Clinic Entrances Act, several states passed analogous laws. The Massachusetts act was the Reproductive Health Care Facilities Act, which was challenged in Federal Court and ultimately struck down in McCullen v. Coakley. However, the decision was narrowly tailored so as not to strike down the FACE Act and other state level laws.

See also
 Legal protection of access to abortion
 Timeline of reproductive rights legislation

References

External links

 Full text of the Freedom of Access to Clinic Entrances Act 
 U.S. Department of Justice page 
 Anti-Abortion Violence Registry

Clinics in the United States
103rd United States Congress
United States federal abortion legislation
United States federal civil rights legislation
United States federal criminal legislation
Anti-abortion violence in the United States